Mas is a surname of Catalan and Occitan or North German and Dutch origin. It accounts for 0.068% of the population in Spain, with 0.879% found amongst Catalans, and 0.017% in France.

Origin and Meaning
Catalan and Occitan: topographic name for someone who lived in an isolated dwelling in the country, rather than in a village, from Catalan and Occitan mas 'farmstead' (Late Latin mansum, mansus).
North German and Dutch: from a short form of Thomas. Compare Maas and Mass.

People
Alejandro Bofill Mas (born 1960), Catalan chess player and FIDE international master
Alphonse Mas (1817–1875), French President of the French Pomological Society and Ain Horticultural Society
André Boyer-Mas (1904–1972), French cleric and diplomat
Alexandre Mas, Catalan-American economist
 Álvaro Mas (born 1992), Spanish footballer 
Andreu Mas-Colell (born 1944), Catalan economist
Antoni Colom Mas (born 1978), Catalan cyclist
Antoni Mas i Borràs, Knight of the Order of Montesa
Antoni Mas Fornés (born 1968), historian and writer, who in 2005 received the OCB Miquel dels Sants Oliver Prize
Anna Genover-Mas (born 1963), Catalan journalist and writer of children's books, one of which won the Vicenta Ferrer Vila de Paterna prize for the best children's literature book of 2007
Arcadi Mas i Fondevila (1852–1934), Catalan painter and artist and founder of the Sitges Luminista School
Artur Mas (born 1956), Catalan politician
Bernat Mas "des Plá del Rey", knighted for his service to King John II of Castile in the wars against the Prince of Vienna
Carlos Mas Samora (born 1957), Catalan former all-terrain motorcyclist 
Carolyne Mas (born 1955), American singer-songwriter, guitarist, pianist and producer
Ezequiel González Mas (1919–2007), Spanish historian
Francesc Joan Mas (born 1522), Catalan philosopher
Francesc Mas i Ros (1901–1985), Catalan composer
Francis Mas (1936–2006), French former player for the French rugby union team and rugby league team
Gabriel Mas Arbona (born 1933), Catalan cyclist, known for placing in the 1959 Volta a Espanya and winning the 1960 Volta a Andalusia
Guillem Mas, among those who formed the "Sixteen" in 1521
Jaume Mas "des Plá del Rey", alderman of the municipality of Palma
Jaume Mas, Bishop of Vic (1674–1684)
Jean-Baptiste Charles Mas de Polart (born 1775), French General and Lieutenant General
Jeanne Mas (born 1958), Catalan born French pop singer and actress
Joan Mas (born 1520), in 1550 fought against the Turks that had invaded Pollensa
Joan Mas i Bauzà (1928–1992), Catalan writer
Juan Vicente Mas Quiles (born 1921), Catalan orchestra and band conductor and composer
Joan Mas i Cantí, Catalan economist
Joan Mas i Ramon (born 1934), Catalan post-impressionist painter
Joan Mas i Ramon (born 1932), Catalan postimpressionist painter
Joan Mas i Vives (born 1951), Catalan literary critic, author and philologist
Josep Moragues i Mas (1669–1715), Catalan General who fought in the War of Spanish Succession
Jorge Mas Canosa (1939–1997), Cuban-American activist best known for his strong opposition to Fidel Castro and his leadership of the Cuban-American National Foundation
Jorge Mas, Cuban-American entrepreneur, philanthropist and human rights advocate, son of Jorge Mas Canosa
Josep Vicenç Foix i Mas (1893–1987), Catalan poet, journalist and essayist
Lluís Mas i Borràs, Knight of the Order of Montesa
Lluís Mas i Pons (1903–1975), Catalan lawyer, teacher, poet and writer
Lluís Mas i Ossó (1908–1984), Catalan athlete and politician
Manuel Mas Ribó (born 1946), former foreign minister of Andorra
Miguel Mas, member in 1569 of the Gran and General Counsel of the Kingdom of Spain
Miguel Mas (born 1967), Argentinian actor, producer, director and screenwriter, known for his roles on television, as a guest star on the long-running medical drama ER
Miquel Mas Ferrà (born 1950), Catalan writer
Miquel Mas Gayà (born 1943), Catalan cycling world champion
Nicolas Mas (born 1980), French player for the French rugby union team
Nicolas Mas-Castellane (died 1586), French Huguenot General in the French Wars of Religion
Oscar Más (born 1946), Argentine former football striker for Club Atlético River Plate
Pere Sampol Mas (born 1951), Cantalan technical engineer in the electronics industry, known for his political facet of the PSM
Father Vicente Mas, member of the Carthusian Order
Regino Más i Marí (1899–1968), Catalan Falles artist
Roger Mas (born 1931), French politician
Salvador Mas i Conde (born 1951), Catalan conductor and musical and artistic director of the City of Granada Orchestra
Sergi Mas, Andorran sculptor, designer, illustrator, painter, engraver, lithographer and writer
Sergi Mas y Abad (born 1964), Catalan actor and journalist
Sinibaldo de Mas (1809–1868), Catalan sinologist, painter, calligrapher, writer, ambassador, adventurer, photography pioneer, and known Spanish government diplomat to Asia during the 19th century
 Teodoro de Mas y Nadal (1858-1936), Catalan engineer and politician

References

See also
 Mas (disambiguation)

Surnames
Catalan-language surnames